Mackevičius is a Lithuanian surname, a form of the Polish surname Mackiewicz and Belarusian Matskevich. Feminine forms: Mackevičienė (married or widow), Mackevičiūtė (unmarried). Another Lithuanized form of the same surname is Mackevič.

Notable people with this surname include:

Antanas Mackevičius (1828–1863), Lithuanian priest and rebel
 (1926-2011), Lithuanian stage and TV actress and reciter 
Ernest Mackevičius (born 1968),  Russian journalist and TV host of Lithuanian origin

Lithuanian-language surnames
Surnames of Polish origin